Exeter Book Riddle 5 (according to the numbering of the Anglo-Saxon Poetic Records) is one of the Old English riddles found in the later tenth-century Exeter Book. Its usual solution is 'shield', but other solutions, such as 'chopping board', are also possible.

Text
As edited by Richard Marsden and rendered in a poetic translation by David Curzon, the poem reads:

A more literal, prose translation by S. A. J. Bradley runs
I am on my own, wounded by weapon of iron, scarred by sword, wearied from the actions of the fray, exhausted from the edges of the blade. Often I see battle and fight the foe. The consolation that relief from the toil of war shall come to me before I am completely done for amongst men, I do not expect; instead, the products of hammers, the hard-edged blade, bloodily sharp, the handiwork of the smiths, buffet and bite me within the strongholds. I must continue to await encounters yet more hostile. Never have I been able to find in town the kind of physician that has healed with herbs my wounds; instead, the sword-gashes upon me grow bigger through mortal blows by day and by night.

Editions and translations

 Matthias Ammon, translation and commentary for Riddle 5, The Riddle Ages: Old English Riddles, Translations and Commentaries, ed. by Megan Cavell, with Matthias Ammon, Neville Mogford and Victoria Symons (Birmingham: University of Birmingham, 2020 [first publ. 2013])
 Foys, Martin et al. (eds.) Old English Poetry in Facsimile Project, (Madison, WI: Center for the History of Print and Digital Culture, 2019-). Online edition annotated and linked to digital facsimile, with a modern translation.

Recordings

 Michael D. C. Drout, 'Riddle 5', performed from the Anglo-Saxon Poetic Records edition (19 October 2007).

References

Riddles
Old English literature
Old English poetry